The following highways are numbered 63A:

United States
 County Road 63A (Leon County, Florida)
 Nebraska Link 63A
 New York State Route 63A (former)
 Oklahoma State Highway 63A